1930 in philosophy

Events

Publications 
 Paul Dirac, Principles of Quantum Mechanics (1930)

Philosophical literature 
 Robert Musil, The Man Without Qualities (1930-1942)

Births 
 March 8 - Ernst Tugendhat 
 March 12 - Kurt Flasch 
 April 9 - Nathaniel Branden (died 2014)
 April 12 - Bryan Magee (died 2019)
 May 3 - Luce Irigaray 
 June 13 - Paul Veyne 
 July 11 - Harold Bloom 
 July 15 - Jacques Derrida (died 2004)
 July 19 - Daniel Callahan (died 2019)
 August 1 - Pierre Bourdieu 
 September 14 - Allan Bloom (died 1992)
 September 28 - Immanuel Wallerstein

Deaths 
 January 19 - Frank Ramsey (born 1903)

References 

Philosophy
20th-century philosophy
Philosophy by year